Sandstorm is an autonomous vehicle created by Carnegie Mellon University's Red Team, for the 2004 and 2005 DARPA Grand Challenge competition. It is a heavily modified 1986 M998 HMMWV.

Sandstorm qualified in first position in the 2004 DARPA Grand Challenge.  It traveled the fastest and farthest (7.4 miles) during the race before high centering on an embankment.

The sensors used by Sandstorm in 2004 included three fixed LIDAR laser-ranging units, one steerable LIDAR (in the globe on top), a radar unit (developed in collaboration with the Duke University Robotics Team), and a pair of cameras for stereo vision.  Sandstorm also had an Applanix POS/LV system, providing a GPS and inertial navigation system for determining geographical position.

Since the 2004 race Sandstorm has been continually tested and modified, logging hundreds of test miles.  Testing includes an unprecedented continuous 200 mile test run at an average of 28 miles per hour.

The 2005 version of Sandstorm used six fixed LIDAR units, the steerable LIDAR, and short- and long-range radar.

Sandstorm competed in the 2005 DARPA Grand Challenge on October 8th, qualifying third from the pole position behind Stanley and finished in 7 hours, 5 minutes, placing 2nd out of the five vehicles to complete the 132-mile course.

See also
 H1ghlander - Sandstorm's sister vehicle

External links

 Carnegie Mellon Red Team Racing
 2004 Technical Paper

Experimental self-driving cars
Carnegie Mellon University
DARPA Grand Challenge